Coleophora tanitella is a moth of the family Coleophoridae. It is found in Portugal, Spain and Tunisia.  It is reddish-brown in color.

The larvae feed on Juncus acutus. They feed on the generative organs of their host plant.

References

tanitella
Moths of Europe
Moths of Africa
Moths described in 1982